The following is an episode list for the long-running BBC One sitcom Last of the Summer Wine which was broadcast from 4 January 1973 to 29 August 2010.



Overview
The pilot episode aired as an episode of Comedy Playhouse on 4 January 1973 and the first full series of episodes premiered on 12 November the very same year. The 31st (and final) series started broadcasting on 25 July 2010. Every episode was written by Roy Clarke.

As of 29 August 2010 (the very last day of transmission), a total of around 295 episodes of Last of the Summer Wine have aired. This includes the Comedy Playhouse pilot, twenty-four Christmas Specials, three New Year Specials and a Millennium Special (but not the short Christmas sketch, a comedy trial or the 25 Year and 30 Year Documentaries). Some of these have been regular episodes (often held over from the previous series, or taken from the forthcoming series), others have been dedicated festive stories. Some of these specials have also been feature-length. All episodes are 30 minutes long, unless otherwise stated.

Series overview

Episodes

Series 1 (1973)

The pilot episode, known as either "The Last of the Summer Wine" or "Of Funerals and Fish," which originally premiered on the BBC's Comedy Playhouse was included as an Extra feature on Series 31 & 32 on disc 4 which was released on 15 August 2016.

Series 2 (1975)

Series 3 (1976)

Series 4 (1977-78)

Series 5 (1979)

Series 6 (1982)

Series 7 (1983)

Series 8 (1985)

Series 9 (1987)

Series 10 (1988)

Series 11 (1989)

Series 12 (1990)

Series 13 (1991)

Series 14 (1992)

Series 15 (1993)

Series 16 (1995)

Series 17 (1995)

Series 18 (1997)

Series 19 (1998)

Series 20 (1999)

Series 21 (2000)

Series 22 (2001)

Series 23 (2002)

Series 24 (2003)

Series 25 (2004)

Series 26 (2005)

Episodes in series 26 were broadcast out of sequence. Who's That Mouse in the Poetry Group? was due to be shown on 3 April 2005, but postponed to 17 April 2005, due to a last minute schedule change. Hermione (the Short Course) was broadcast as originally planned on 10 April 2005, as the TV listings magazines had already been published for that week's programmes.

Series 27 (2006)

Series 28 (2007)

Series 29 (2008)

Series 30 (2009)

Series 31 (2010)

Miscellaneous

Shorts

Documentaries

Notes
 The DVD boxset issued on this date is labelled series 9 & 10. However, it contains only the twelve episodes listed for series 9 below plus the three Specials. It contains none of the episodes listed for series 10. The six series 10 episodes were released along with the seven of series 11 and two Specials in a boxset labelled Series 11 & 12. The ten Series 12 episodes were released along with the six Series 13 episodes and two Specials in another boxset labelled series 13 & 14. The nine series 14 episodes were released along with the nine series 15 episodes and two specials in another boxset labelled series 15 & 16 released on 26 October 2009. The eight series 16 episodes were released along with the ten series 17 episodes and two specials in another boxset labelled series 17 & 18 released on 27 December 2010. The ten series 18 episodes were released along with the ten series 19 episodes and two specials in another boxset labelled series 19 & 20 on 7 February 2011. The ten series 20 episodes were released along with the ten series 21 episodes and the Millennium special in another boxset labelled series 21 & 22 on 26 March 2012. The ten series 22 episodes were released along with the ten series 23 episodes and two specials in another boxset labelled series 23 & 24 on 23 April 2012. The ten series 24 episodes were released along with the ten series 25 episodes and two specials in another boxset labelled series 25 & 26 on 29 September 2014. The ten series 26 episodes were released along with the nine series 27 episodes and two specials in another boxset labelled series 27 & 28 on 5 October 2015. The ten series 28 episodes were released along with the eleven series 29 episodes in another boxset labeled series 29 & 30 on 16 May 2016. The ten series 30 episodes were released along with the six series 31, the 2008 New Year special and an extra feature of the Comedy Playhouse Pilot episode of Funerals and Fish in a final boxset labelled series 31 & 32 on 15 August 2016. All 295 episodes were cleared by the BBFC.
The first three episodes of series 1 were edited together on the DVD in what appeared to be a straight transfer from the video release in the 1980s. "Pâté & Chips" ended with credits for all three episodes plus the original BBC Video ident, however a re-release of series 1 & 2 in 2011 put all three episodes with their start and end credits back on them, on the same re-release the scene from the series 2 episode "Some Enchanted Evening" which was missing on the original release has been put back into the episode. Over the years there has been a number of edits on DVD releases in all regions with region 1 having certain music edits on the DVD releases. Region 2 DVDs have some edits such as Milburn not appearing in "The Loxley Lozenge" as he did on original transmission and "Uncle of the Bride" and "Big Day at Dream Acres" on the DVD release being only 1 of 3 versions of each episode, "Elegy for Fallen Wellies" on the region 2 DVDs is the alternate version on DVD and not the original transmission version, another episode edited was on the re-release of series 3 & 4 in 2010 when a line was removed from "The Kink in Foggy's Niblick" when the lady golfers go walking past Compo and Clegg. Apart from "Elegy for Fallen Wellies" there doesn't appear to be much editing on the later releases in region 2. A scene with Milburn and Pearl in the cafe is also cut from the series 8 episode "Catching Digyby's Donkey", which is present on the region 1 DVD release.

References

Lists of British sitcom episodes
Episodes